Agriopoma is a genus of saltwater clams, marine bivalve molluscs in the family Veneridae, the venus clams.

Species
 Agriopoma arestum (Dall & C. T. Simpson, 1901)
 Agriopoma catharium (Dall, 1902)
 † Agriopoma gatunensis (Dall, 1903) 
 Agriopoma morrhuanum (Dall, 1902)
 Agriopoma texasianum (Dall, 1892) – Texas venus
 Agriopoma tomeanum (Dall, 1902)
Synonyms
 Agriopoma aequinoctiale Fischer-Piette, 1969: synonym of Pitar consanguineus (C. B. Adams, 1852)
 Agriopoma mexicanum (Hertlein & A. M. Strong, 1948): synonym of Agriopoma catharium (Dall, 1902)
 Agriopoma morrhuanus [sic]: synonym of Agriopoma morrhuanum (Dall, 1902) (incorrect gender ending)
 Agriopoma texasiana (Dall, 1892): synonym of Agriopoma texasianum (Dall, 1892) (incorrect gender ending)

References

External links
 Dall, W. H. (1902). Illustrations and descriptions of new, unfigured, or imperfectly known shells, chiefly American in the U. S. National Museum. Proceedings of the United States National Museum. 24 (1264): 499-566, pls 27-40.
 Palmer K. Van Winkle. (1927-1929). The Veneridae of eastern America, Cenozoic and Recent. Palaeontographica Americana. 1(5): 209-522 [March 1927, pls 32-76]

Veneridae
Bivalve genera